New Slovenia – Christian Democrats (NSi) is a Christian-democratic, conservative political party in Slovenia. Since 2018, it is led by Matej Tonin. The party was formed on 4 August 2000 following a split in the unified Slovenian People's Party and Slovene Christian Democrats (SLS+SKD). NSi is a member of the European People's Party (EPP) and in the European Parliament its MEP Ljudmila Novak sits with the EPP Group. At the most recent Slovenian parliamentary election in 2022, NSi secured 6.86% of all votes, thus gaining 8 seats in the National Assembly.

History

Establishment 
In July 2000, Andrej Bajuk, by the time Prime Minister of a centre-right coalition government, and other centrist Christian democrats disagreed with the rest of the Slovenian People's Party (SLS+SKD) over the question of a new electoral system. While Bajuk wanted the National Assembly to abandon proportional representation, the SLS+SKD party voted against any changes. Therefore, Bajuk retired from the party and created New Slovenia as his Prime Ministerial vehicle. Other former members of the Slovene Christian Democrats opposed to the merger of SKD and SLS, followed the foundation appeal. In the October 2000 parliamentary election, the new party won 8.6% of the vote and eight seats. Thereupon, Bajuk resigned as Prime Minister and New Slovenia went into opposition.

Since 2004 
From 2004 to 2008, New Slovenia was part of the centre-right coalition led by Prime Minister Janez Janša.

The first European Parliament election with Slovenian participation in 2004 was won by New Slovenia which received 24% of the votes and secured two of the seven Slovenian seats.

At the 2008 legislative elections, the party won only 3.4% of the popular vote and did not win any seats in the 90-seat National Assembly. After the elective failure of 2008, Bajuk announced his immediate resignation and retirement from politics. Ljudmila Novak succeeded him as party president.

At the 2011 Slovenian parliamentary election on 4 December 2011, it won 4.88% of votes, thus gaining four seats in the National Assembly.

In the 2014 European election, NSi ran in a joint electoral list with the Slovenian People's Party, which received 16.56% of the vote and came in second place, returning 2 MEPs.

The party received 5.53% of the vote in the Slovenian parliamentary election on 13 July 2014, and won 5 seats in parliament.

At the 2018 Parliamentary election, NSi received 7.16% of electoral votes, which resulted in 7 parliamentary seats. The party was in opposition until March 2020, when it entered a centre-right coalition with SDS, SMC and DeSUS.

NSi's Ljudmila Novak was elected as one of 8 MEPs of Slovenia at the 2019 European election.

Since the Slovenian parliamentary election in 2022, NSi holds 8 seats in the National Assembly. It is currently in opposition.

Ideology
New Slovenia has taken a staunchly Christian conservative position on some issues, advocating traditional social values and defending the position of the Catholic Church on moral questions. It has also been opposed to same-sex marriage and adoption by same sex couples, although it does support (and it also voted for) the current legislation, which gives certain rights to registered same sex couples.

In economic issues, it is generally liberal, but it defends a social market economy. It is a decidedly pro-European party.

In 2019, party leader Matej Tonin announced that the party would reposition itself in the political centre while refreshing its programme. Tonin reiterated its commitment to social market economy.

Electoral results

National Assembly

European Parliament

Presidential

Prominent members
Andrej Bajuk (deceased in 2011)
Lojze Peterle
Ljudmila Novak
Lovro Šturm
Jure Zupan
Mojca Kucler Dolinar
Janez Drobnič (left the party in 2008)
Andrej Capuder
Matej Tonin

References

External links
Official site

2000 establishments in Slovenia
Christian democratic parties in Europe
Catholic political parties
Conservative parties in Slovenia
Member parties of the European People's Party
Organizations based in Ljubljana
Political parties established in 2000
Pro-European political parties in Slovenia